Mohamed Eyiad (born 25 May 1960) is a Kuwaiti fencer. He competed in the team sabre event at the 1980 Summer Olympics.

References

External links
 

1960 births
Living people
Kuwaiti male sabre fencers
Olympic fencers of Kuwait
Fencers at the 1980 Summer Olympics